Patriarch Pajsije may refer to:

 Pajsije of Janjevo, Archbishop of Peć and Serbian Patriarch from 1614 to 1647
 Pajsije II, Archbishop of Peć and Serbian Patriarch for a short time during 1758